Pashinskaya is a rural locality (a village) in Kumzerskoye Rural Settlement, Kharovsky District, Vologda Oblast, Russia. The population was 19 as of 2002.

Geography 
Pashinskaya is located 17 km east of Kharovsk (the district's administrative centre) by road. Sofonikha is the nearest rural locality.

References 

Rural localities in Kharovsky District